Obesotoma japonica is a species of sea snail, a marine gastropod mollusk in the family Mangeliidae.

Description
The length of the shell varies between 24 mm and 27 mm.

Distribution
This species was found in the Sea of Japan off Hokkaido Island at a depth of 783 m.

References

External links
  Tucker, J.K. 2004 Catalog of recent and fossil turrids (Mollusca: Gastropoda). Zootaxa 682:1–1295.
 
 Biolib.cz: Obesotoma japonica

japonica
Gastropods described in 1941